Svinino is a rural locality (a village) in Komyanskoye Rural Settlement, Gryazovetsky District, Vologda Oblast, Russia. The population was 10 as of 2002.

Geography 
Svinino is located 26 km north of Gryazovets (the district's administrative centre) by road. Semyonkovo is the nearest rural locality.

References 

Rural localities in Gryazovetsky District